The coal-crested finch (Charitospiza eucosma) is a species of bird in the family Thraupidae. Though previously classified in the bunting and American sparrow family Emberizidae, molecular phylogenetic studies have shown that it is a member of the large tanager family Thraupidae. It is the only member of the genus Charitospiza.

It is found mainly in the Cerrado, with small amounts in Bolivia and northern Argentina. Its natural habitat is dry savanna. It is threatened by habitat loss. It feeds on seed of plants specifically found in these habitats.

Taxonomy
The coal-crested finch was formally described in 1905 by the American ornithologist Harry C. Oberholser. He introduced a new genus Charitospiza and coined the binomial name Charitospiza eucosma. The genus name combines the Ancient Greek kharis meaning "grace" or "beauty" and spiza meaning "finch". The specific epithet is from the Ancient Greek eukosmos meaning "decorous" or "well-adorned". The type locality is the state of Bahia in Brazil, near the border with Minas Gerais. The species is monotypic: no subspecies are recognised.

Gallery

References

External links

coal-crested finch
Birds of the Cerrado
coal-crested finch
coal-crested finch
Taxonomy articles created by Polbot